Bengal Province or Province of Bengal, may refer to the Imperial Province of the Bengal region under two periods of imperial rule in South Asia:
Bengal Subah (1574–1765), Province (Subah) of the Mughal Empire
Bengal Presidency (1765–1947), Presidency of the British Indian Empire